PB-45 Quetta-IX is a constituency of the Provincial Assembly of Balochistan.

General elections 2018

See also 

 PB-44 Quetta-VIII
 PB-46 Pishin-cum-Karezat

References

External links 

 Election commission Pakistan's official website
 Awazoday.com check result
 Balochistan's Assembly official site

Constituencies of Balochistan